Fear X is a 2003 psychological thriller film directed by Nicolas Winding Refn. The first film to be produced from one of Hubert Selby Jr.'s original screenplays, its eventual box-office failure would force Refn's film company Jang Go Star into bankruptcy. Refn's financial recovery was documented in the 2006 documentary The Gambler.

Plot
Mall cop Harry Caine obsessively investigates the murder of his pregnant wife, Claire, who was killed alongside a DEA agent at his work. His co-workers support him but express concern when he becomes aggressive with customers. He is kept up at night by visions of his wife walking toward an empty house in his neighborhood. The police call him in and question him before showing him an extremely blurry photo of the man they claim is his wife's killer. 

While combing through mall security footage given to him by his co-worker, he witnesses her murder, and becomes convinced that the empty house contains answers. He sneaks in and finds only a couple of boxes from which he steals a roll of film. He has it developed at the mall and studies the pictures. He is shocked to realize that they were taken in a place he visited with Claire called Morristown, Montana. He drives there and checks into the hotel where he and Claire stayed, then visits the locations he spotted in the photos. This leads him to a diner, where he asks a waitress about one of the women in the pictures, claiming that they have a mutual friend. He is confronted by a police officer, who takes his information and asks why he is trying to find the woman. 

The cop notifies a fellow officer named Peter of Caine's presence, and Peter rushes home to check on the safety of his child. Concerned by his behavior, his wife (who turns out to be the woman from the photo) asks what is going on, but he tells her that Harry is just someone who was involved in an old case and asks her to take their kid to go to visit her sister. He then calls his bosses together and tells them that Harry Caine is in town. 

It is revealed that Peter is part of a secretive organization within the police force that assassinates corrupt officers across the United States. While on a mission to kill a corrupt DEA agent, Peter accidentally shot Claire. It has haunted him ever since, and causes him to break down in front of his superiors. They tell him that Caine needs to be killed, and offer to do it for him. He rejects their offer and says that he must do it himself. Caine receives a call from Peter, who claims to be able to help him find the woman in the picture. Peter lures him to another room in the hotel and questions him. Both on edge, they leave the room just as Harry realizes that Peter is his wife's killer. 

Peter shoots him in the side. Wracked with guilt, Peter hesitates before firing again, which allows him to run to the elevator, mirroring a vision he had earlier that day. He takes the elevator down, and has the opportunity to get off on a lower floor, but upon seeing his own blood, flies into a rage and returns to Peter's floor, stumbling out of the elevator into complete darkness. 

Flashes of red overtake the screen, and Harry wakes up on a hospital bed in a police station, confessing to Peter's murder. One of the officers taking his statement is called out of the room by the cop from the diner, who tells him something that visibly frightens him. He returns to the room and informs Harry that the police found no body or evidence of any kind, then tells him that he cannot change what has already happened, and needs to focus on the future. Harry breaks down crying. He is let go, and the cop from the diner drives him to a crossroads, providing him with a new car and all of his luggage. Harry dumps all of the photos and clues about his wife's murder on the side of the road and drives away.

Cast
 John Turturro as Harry
 Deborah Kara Unger as Kate
 Stephen McIntyre as Phil
 William Allen Young as Agent Lawrence
 Gene Davis as Ed (as Eugene M. Davis)
 Mark Houghton as Diner Cop
 Jacqueline Ramel as Claire
 James Remar as Peter
 Amanda Ooms as Prostitute

Critical reception
On Rotten Tomatoes, the film has an approval rating of 58% based on reviews from 36 critics. The site's consensus states: "As hazy, unsettling, and fleetingly insubstantial as a dream, Fear X will lose many viewers in its ambiguities, but is partly propped up by strong work from John Turturro." On Metacritic, the film earned a score of 61 out of 100, based on reviews from 12 critics, indicating "generally favorable reviews."

Though the film itself has received mixed reviews, the majority praise John Turturro's performance. LA Weekly says "Turturro ... never wavers in his commitment to a role that deprives him of nearly all his actorly tools. (He) keeps Fear X fascinating." The New York Daily News says "Turturro's subtle turn keeps our emotional connection solid" and Compuserve adds "Turturro gets under your skin."

Film ending
Director Nicolas Winding Refn commented on the ending within several interviews:
In an interview with BBC:
 "Harry’s impossible quest raises questions, but it all adds to the brave elliptical nature of this film. So did Refn ever get to the bottom of those questions in his own mind? "I can’t answer that," he says bluntly. "It depends on how I feel that day. And of course that pisses off a lot of people because they’re not used to a film without an ending. But what the f**k is an ending, you know?"
In an interview with IndieWire:
 "Fear X" is about idealists and when they're confronted with reality, a lot of the time their ideals are tested and turned and they're no longer what they thought they would be..."
"You can view it in many different ways... it's so up to your own interpretation."'
 "How were we going to end this, without giving anything away, without making it too obvious, because the minute the audience's mind begins to work, you're on very dangerous ground. Because if you tell them too much, they're disappointed and if you don't give them any clues, they get confused. So it's that fine line of giving the audience as they walk out, okay, I believe it's this or I believe it's that. We never gave more in the script."

Actor John Turturro also commented on the ending within an interview with Channel 4: "I liked it because the idea of the story was about a simple man thrust into this overwhelming, debilitating circumstance, and he never really finds out what happens... Nicholas doesn't have all the answers to what he's trying to do. A lot of times these guys, their biggest problem is solving the script, but Nicholas seems to be a filmmaker who likes to throw the script away."

Festivals

(Listed chronologically)
 Sundance Film Festival
 International Film Festival Rotterdam
 Gothenburg Film Festival
 NatFilm Festival
 Cognac Film Festival
 Cannes Film Market
 Sochi International Film Festival
 Karlovy Vary Film Festival
 Melbourne International Film Festival
 L'Étrange Festival
 Filmfest Hamburg
 Sitges Film Festival
 Fantasporto Film Festival

Awards
 2003 - Sochi International Film Festival - Nominated - Golden Rose
 2003 - Sitges - Catalan International Film Festival - Nominated - Best Film
 2004 - Bodil Awards - Nominated - Best Actor
 2004 - Fantasporto - Nominated - Best Film
 2004 - Fantasporto - Won - Best Screenplay

Production
The film was shot in sequence (chronological order).

Film Locations
 Polo Park, Winnipeg, Manitoba, Canada
 Winnipeg, Manitoba, Canada

References

External links
 
  
 Channel 4 Interview with John Turturro 
 BBC Interview with Nicolas Winding Refn 

2003 psychological thriller films
2003 films
British psychological thriller films
English-language Danish films
Films directed by Nicolas Winding Refn
Films set in the United States
Danish thriller films
2000s English-language films
2000s British films